The 2022 United States Senate election in Illinois was held on November 8, 2022, to elect a member of the United States Senate to represent the state of Illinois.

Incumbent Democratic Senator Tammy Duckworth was first elected in 2016, defeating Republican incumbent Mark Kirk. In 2022, Duckworth was re-elected for a second term against former U.S. House of Representatives candidate Kathy Salvi, the Republican nominee. Winning by a margin of 15.3%, 0.2% more than her 2016 margin. Duckworth became the first woman ever to be re-elected for a second term in the state's history. This was also the first Illinois Senate election where both major party candidates were female. Salvi flipped 7 counties--Calhoun, McDonough, Knox, Gallatin, Pulaski, Alexander, and Madison--that had voted for Duckworth in 2016. On the other hand, Duckworth won McLean, Peoria, and Winnebago, which had all supported Republican Mark Kirk in 2016.

This was the first time since 1986 that a Class 3 Illinois senator was re-elected to a successive six-year term, and the first time since 1992 that any party won the seat consecutively. This was also the first time a Democrat won this seat in a midterm election since 1986.

Background 
This Senate seat was unfavorable to incumbents and parties in power over the past several decades. No person elected to this seat was re-elected since Alan J. Dixon in 1986. Dixon sought re-election in 1992 for a third term in office, but lost in the Democratic primary to Carol Moseley Braun, when she was defeated for re-election in 1998 by her Republican challenger Peter Fitzgerald. He retired in 2004 and his seat was won by Democrat Barack Obama, who resigned in 2008 upon his election as the President of the United States. His successor was Roland Burris, who was appointed by then-Gov. Rod Blagojevich to fill the vacancy. However, in 2010, the seat changed parties for the fourth time in a row, with Republican Mark Kirk elected that year to become Burris's successor, taking office in November to fill the final weeks of Obama's unfinished senate term in the 111th Congress. Kirk was then defeated himself in 2016 by then-U.S. Rep. Tammy Duckworth.

Democratic primary

Candidates

Nominee
 Tammy Duckworth, incumbent U.S. Senator

Endorsements

Results

Republican primary

Candidates

Nominee

Eliminated in primary
 Casey Chlebek, real estate agent
 Matthew Dubiel, owner of WCKG
 Peggy Hubbard, former police officer, U.S. Navy veteran, and candidate for U.S. Senate in 2020
 Bobby Piton, investor and activist
 Anthony Williams

Disqualified
 Tim Arview, insurance agent
 Maryann Mahlen
 Allison Salinas, activist

Declined
 Tom Demmer, state representative (ran for Illinois Treasurer)
 Adam Kinzinger, U.S. Representative for

Endorsements

Polling
Graphical summary

Results

General election

Predictions

Endorsements

Polling
Aggregate polls

Graphical summary

Tammy Duckworth vs. generic opponent

Results

See also 
 2022 United States Senate elections

Notes

References

External links 
Official campaign websites
 Tammy Duckworth (D) for Senate
 Kathy Salvi (R) for Senate
 Bill Redpath (L) for Senate

2022
Illinois
United States Senate